Hendon College may refer to:
Hendon College of Technology, a former college that is now a part of Middlesex University
Hendon College, a former college of further education that merged with Barnet College in 2000
Hendon Police College, a police training college